Thomas Stephens (born 18 November 1969) is a Liberian boxer. He competed in the men's bantamweight event at the 1988 Summer Olympics.

References

1969 births
Living people
Liberian male boxers
Olympic boxers of Liberia
Boxers at the 1988 Summer Olympics
Place of birth missing (living people)
Bantamweight boxers